Giuseppe Avanzi (August 30, 1645 – May 29, 1718) was an Italian painter of the Baroque period, mainly active in Ferrara.

He trained with Cattaneo in Ferrara. He was a prolific painter of religious canvases in his natal city, including for the Certosa of Ferrara and the church of the Madonna della Pieta.

References

External links
Census of Ferrarese Paintings and Drawings
 Dizionario dei pittori. Biografie di artisti ferraresi del Seicento

1645 births
1718 deaths
People from the Province of Ferrara
17th-century Italian painters
Italian male painters
18th-century Italian painters
Italian Baroque painters
Painters from Ferrara
18th-century Italian male artists